This is a bibliography of the works of the prolific illustrator and author Edward Ardizzone, CBE RA (16 October 1900- 8 November 1979).

The Little Tim series, written and illustrated by Edward Ardizzone

Other books written and illustrated by Edward Ardizzone

Books by others, illustrated by Edward Ardizzone

Other contributions to publications 
In addition to the works Edward Ardizzone both penned and illustrated, and the works he fully illustrated, Ardizzone was also a regular contributor to periodicals, magazines and provided numerous cover, or dust jacket, illustrations for works by other authors. His contributions can be found in periodicals such as The Strand Magazine, Punch, Lilliput Magazine, The Saturday Book, and The Radio Times. Vogue magazine featured Ardizzone illustrations in their Coronation issue, June 1953. References to most of these works can be found in Brian Alderson's bibliography. 

Ardizzone also produced illustrations for a number of companies for marketing, advertising and newsletter purposes, as well a few Christmas cards for commercial use. Companies he illustrated for include Guinness, the Arts Council, the Double Crown Club, Moss Bros., and John Harvey & Sons, Limited. His own personal Christmas cards can be found documented in My Father and Edward Ardizzone by Edward Booth-Clibborn.

References

External links 

 Edward Ardizzone official website

Bibliographies by writer
Bibliographies of British writers